Donothan Bailey is a former US Olympic gymnast who competed in the 2018 U.S. National Gymnastics Championships. At this competition he earned a silver medal in two events. One of them being the parallel bars.  He was on the 2015 US National Team.   He competed at the 2016 Winter Cup, where he won silver on pommel horse. He competed at the 2017 Winter Cup, where he won bronze on horizontal bars.

References

Living people
American gymnasts
Year of birth missing (living people)
Pan American Games medalists in gymnastics
Pan American Games bronze medalists for the United States
Medalists at the 2011 Pan American Games
Gymnasts at the 2011 Pan American Games